KRC Genk Ladies is a Belgian women's football club based in Genk. It is the women's section of KRC Genk

The club was formed as a merger of clubs from Lanaken and Zonhoven in 2013, and has been known as Ladies Genk since 2015 when they relocated to Genk. They play in the Super League, the highest level in Belgium.

Current squad

Former players

Honours

References

External links 
 

Women's football clubs in Belgium
Association football clubs established in 1971
1971 establishments in Belgium
K.R.C. Genk
Sport in Limburg (Belgium)